Barretos Esporte Clube, commonly referred to as Barretos, is a Brazilian professional association football club based in Barretos, São Paulo. The team competes in the Campeonato Paulista Série A3, the third tier of the São Paulo state football league.

History
The club was founded on October 28, 1960. They finished in the second position in the Campeonato Paulista Segunda Divisão, losing the competition to Oeste.

Stadium
Barretos Esporte Clube play their home games at Estádio Antônio Gomes Martins, nicknamed Estádio Fortaleza. The stadium has a maximum capacity of 14,000 people.

References

 
Football clubs in São Paulo (state)
Association football clubs established in 1960
1960 establishments in Brazil
Barretos